The Podgaje massacre refers to the mass murder of Polish People's Armies POWs, who were captured in January 1945 by the Waffen SS. The massacre took place in the village of Podgaje during the night of 31 January, during which approximately 160–210 POWs of the 4th Company, 3rd Infantry Regiment, of the 1st Tadeusz Kościuszko Infantry Division  were executed. The murders were most likely committed by the 48th Dutch SS Grenadier regiment and/or by one of the German SS battle groups in the area.

The Polish soldiers were captured during the First Polish Armies attempt of breaking through the German defensive fortifications, known as the Pomeranian Wall.

The Podgaje massacre is commemorated on the Tomb of the Unknown Soldier, Warsaw, with the inscription "PODGAJE 31 I 1945".

Allegations of Latvian Legionnaire involvement 

The Moscow based newspaper Arguments and Facts alleges that:
"... in February 1945, in the territory of Poland, the troops and officers of the 15th Waffen Grenadier Division of the SS burned more than 30 Polish soldiers from the 1st infantry division." "The prisoners were brought to a shed, where their hands were tied with barbed wire, then the people and the shed were covered with petrol and ignited.": Josifs Korens, the Co-President of the “Latvian Anti-fascist Committee”, as if referring to the stories of “local eyewitnesses”, adds absolutely surreal detail to this barbaric scene in his publications, he claims that, while burning the Polish soldiers, the troops of the Latvian legion “were singing songs and dancing around the shed” 

Latvian historians Ēriks Jēkabsons and Uldis Neiburgs, along with Juergen Fritz and Edward Anders dispute these claims by using, among other sources, the previous findings of Latvian historians and the diary of Major Jūlijs Ķīlītis, the Commander of the 1st battalion of the 34th grenadier regiment of the 15th Waffen SS Grenadier Division. (Latvian Legion) The information on the number of prisoners varies, but it is estimated that a total of 150 Polish soldiers were captured by Latvians. Immediately after entering Podgaje, at approximately 9:00 p.m. Major Jūlijs Ķīlītis surrendered the prisoners to the commander of the units that defended the village, SS Hauptsturmführer Helmut Traeger. Afterwards, the Latvian Legionnaires were relocated to their positions for the defense of the village.

On the next day, 1 February, upon arriving at the German headquarters, Ķīlītis asked the German officers, where the prisoners had been placed. "The Germans exchanged expressive glances, huffed in what looked somewhat like embarrassment, and then one of them said that I need not care about them anymore, since they needed nothing. This answer surprised and annoyed me, which, obviously was reflected in my face. Before I managed to say something, another of them added that in the situation, where we ourselves are short of food and shelter, as well as manpower for guarding them, there was no other way out. I left the premises without saying a word. On that day I could not go to them again. A feeling of something foreign and vile has fallen between us,...''” Major Ķīlītis continues.

Anders, in his research, reports that the total number of Polish prisoners of war in Podgaje, together with the prisoners brought by Latvians, was approximately 200. All of them were shot during the night of 31 January to 1 February. 32 POWs were killed and their bodies were left in a shed. On 2 February Podgaje came under intense Soviet and Polish artillery and mortar fire, which caused large-scale fires. 90% of the buildings in the village were burnt down, including the aforementioned shed.

Anders and Jurgen concluded that the “disposing of Polish prisoners of war” had commenced before the arrival of the Latvian Legionnaires to Podgaje and continued at the time when the units of the 15th division were in defensive positions. The hands of the victims were not bound with barbed wire, which would also be difficult to do. However, the hands of some (but not all) of the killed people were indeed bound with telephone wires. The story of using petrol to burn the prisoners is also, most probably, far from the truth, because the German army in Pomerania was severely short of fuel and it would be difficult to imagine that fuel would be used for such purposes, since it was required for a quick retreat. The shootings of the Polish prisoners of war were, undoubtedly, an outrageous and inexcusable act of barbarism and a war crime. However, it was not performed by the Latvians, but either by the 48th Dutch SS Grenadier regiment and/or by any of the German Waffen SS battle groups in the area.

An investigation into the massacre of Podgaje was carried out by Koszalin office of the Regional Commission for the Investigation of Nazi Crimes. In 1974, the investigation was terminated, to be reopened by Szczecin Office of Commission for the Prosecution of Crimes Against the Polish Nation, part of the Institute of National Remembrance.

References

Podgaje Massacre
Massacres in 1945
Massacres in Poland
Nazi war crimes in Poland
World War II prisoner of war massacres by Nazi Germany
January 1945 events in Europe
1945 in Poland